Tekipirkent is a rural locality (a selo) in Mikrakhsky Selsoviet, Dokuzparinsky District, Republic of Dagestan, Russia. The population was 282 as of 2010. There are 2 streets.

Geography 
Tekipirkent is located 13 km southwest of Usukhchay (the district's administrative centre) by road. Kaladzhukh and Mikrakh are the nearest rural localities.

Nationalities 
Lezgins live there.

References 

Rural localities in Dokuzparinsky District